Jonathan Martin Segal (July 8, 1953 – November 10, 1999) was an American television actor. He was known for playing the role of Jonathan Brooks in the American drama television series The Paper Chase. Segal also played the recurring role of laboratory technician Jeff Sellers in the medical drama television series Quincy, M.E.

References

External links 

Rotten Tomatoes profile

1953 births
1999 deaths
People from New York (state)
Male actors from New York (state)
American male television actors
20th-century American male actors